The Bagratuni or Bagratid dynasty was an Armenian royal dynasty which ruled the medieval Kingdom of Armenia from c. 885 until 1045. Originating as vassals of the Kingdom of Armenia of antiquity, they rose to become the most prominent Armenian noble family during the period of Arab rule in Armenia, eventually establishing their own independent kingdom. Their domain included regions of Armenia such as Shirak, Bagrevand, Kogovit, Syunik, Lori, Vaspurakan, Vanand and Taron. Many historians, such as Cyril Toumanoff, Nicholas Adontz and Ronald Suny, consider them to be the progenitors of the Georgian royal Bagrationi dynasty.

Early history

The name "Bagratuni" derives from Bagarat, a Parthian variant of the Old Iranian name Bagadata ("God-given"). Historian Cyril Toumanoff speculated that a general of King Tigranes II of Armenia named Bagadates may have been the earliest known member of the Bagratuni family, which first emerged as nakharars—members of the hereditary nobility of Armenia—in the early 4th century. The Arshakuni (Arsacid) dynasty, which ruled Armenia from 52 to 428, granted the family heritable rights. The first Bagratuni prince identified by Toumanoff, Smbat I, lived at the time of the Armenian conversion to Christianity. Starting with Smbat, the Bagratunis held the hereditary titles of aspet, meaning "Master of the Horse" or the commander of the cavalry (although this appears to have been purely ceremonial and not an actual military command), and tagadir, which indicated their privilege of crowning Arshakuni kings upon their accession to the throne. Their domain included the region of Sper in the Çoruh River valley of Upper Armenia, which was famous for its gold and silver, and Tayk. The medieval Armenian historian Movses Khorenatsi claimed they had an ancestor, Smbat, who came to Armenia from Judea in 6th century BCE, but modern historians regard this as an invention to give a biblical origin to the family. Toumanoff proposed instead that the Bagratunis were descended from the Orontids, the first identifiable ruling dynasty of ancient Armenia.

After the 7th-century Arab conquest of Armenia, members of the Bagratuni house often held the title of ishkhan (prince) of Armenia, although they were subordinate to a Muslim governor (ostikan) appointed by the caliphs. The period of Arab rule in Armenia saw the decline of the power of the Mamikonians at the same time as the Bagratunis gained in prominence, as the Muslim governors favored the latter. During the collapse of Umayyad rule in 748, the Bagratuni ishkhan Ashot III reluctantly joined with the other Armenian nobles in a revolt against Arab rule. Ashot was blinded on the orders of Grigor Mamikonian after trying to withdraw from the rebellion, which failed after Grigor's death in 749. Ashot "the Blind" was restored to nominal rule as ishkhan after the Abbasids reestablished Arab rule of Armenia in 750. In 774-775 sparapet Smbat VII Bagratuni led the Armenian nobility in an unsuccessful revolt against the Abbasid Caliphate, although part of the Bagratuni house opposed the rebellion. Smbat was killed at the Battle of Bagrevand along with Mushegh Mamikonian and many other Armenian nobles. After the failed rebellion, the Bagratunis lost control of their domains of Tmorik, Kogovit and their possessions in Vaspurakan, although their losses were less severe than those of the other Armenian noble families.

Smbat VII's son Ashot Msaker restored the fortunes of the dynasty in the 9th century by waging war against the local Arab emir while remaining loyal to the Abbasid caliphs. Ashot Msaker (re-)acquired a number of territories for the Bagratuni family, which were divided between two of his sons: Bagrat II, who received Taron and Sasun along with the new title "Prince of Princes" (ishkhan ishkhanats), and Smbat "the Confessor", who received the title sparapet and the holdings of Sper and Tayk. Meanwhile, Ashot Msaker's uncle, Vasak, established himself in the Georgian region of Iberia; Vasak's grandson Ashot I became the first ruler of Iberia from the Bagratuni dynasty  813. This branch of the dynasty would rule as kings of Georgia for centuries as the Bagrationis.

Bagratids as rulers of Armenia
Ashot I, nephew of Bagrat II, was the first member of the dynasty to rule as King of Armenia. He was recognized as prince of princes by the court at Baghdad in 861, which provoked war with local Arab emirs. Ashot won the war, and was recognized as King of the Armenians by Baghdad in 885. Recognition from Constantinople followed in 886. In an effort to unify the Armenian nation under one flag, the Bagratids subjugated other Armenian noble families through conquests and fragile marriage alliances. Eventually, some noble families such as the Artsrunis and the Siunis broke off from the central Bagratid authority, founding the separate kingdoms of Vaspurakan and Syunik, respectively. Ashot III the Merciful transferred their capital to the city of Ani, now famous for its ruins.  They kept power by playing off the competition between the Byzantine Empire and the Arabs.

They assumed the Persian title of "King of Kings" (Shahanshah). However, with the start of the 10th century and on, the Bagratunis broke up into different branches, fragmenting the kingdom in a time when unity was needed in the face of Seljuk and Byzantine pressure. The rule of the Ani branch ended in 1045 with the conquest of Ani by the Byzantines.

The Kars branch of the family held out until 1064. The junior Kiurikian branch of the Bagratunis continued to rule as independent kings of Tashir-Dzoraget until 1118 and Kakheti-Hereti until 1104, and thereafter as rulers of smaller principalities centered on their fortresses of Tavush and Matsnaberd until the 13th century Mongol conquest of Armenia. The dynasty of Cilician Armenia is believed to be a branch of the Bagratids, which later took the throne of an Armenian Kingdom in Cilicia. The founder, Ruben I, had an unknown relationship to the exiled king Gagik II. He was either a younger family member or kinsman. Ashot, son of Hovhannes (son of Gagik II), was later governor of Ani under the Shaddadid dynasty.

See also
List of Armenian kings
Pakradouni

References

Sources

Further reading
Toumanoff, Cyrille (1976). Manuel de généalogie et de chronologie pour l'histoire de la Caucasie Chrétienne (Arménie-Géorgie-Albanie). Roma: Edizioni Aquila. - Still remains the only account of the family generally available in the West, although its scientific standard has been criticized as very low.
The Families of the Nobility of the Russian Empire, Volume III, Moscow, 1996. - Contains the latest research available in Russian, compiled by Georgian scientists, some of them Bagratids themselves.

External links
Armenian Nobility Site
List of Armenian and Georgian rulers

 
Kingdom of Armenia (antiquity)